This is a list of video gaming-related websites. A video game is an electronic game that involves human interaction with a user interface to generate visual feedback on a video device such as a TV screen or computer monitor. The word video in video game traditionally referred to a raster display device, but it now implies any type of display device that can produce two- or three-dimensional images.

List

See also 

 List of video game webcomics
 Lists of video games

References

Further reading
 Playing to Learn: Video Games in the Classroom. pp. 229–230.
 From Gamer to Game Designer. pp. 278–279.

Video game
Websites